Bir Kilo Kestaneyi Aldım Elliye is a Turkish folkloric tune (Kasik Havasi).

Original form
The original form of the  Kaşık Havası  was popular in Antalya .

References

Turkish music
Turkish songs
Year of song unknown
Songwriter unknown